The 1989 Tournament of the Americas, later known as the FIBA Americas Championship and the FIBA AmeriCup, was a basketball championship hosted by Mexico from June 8 to June 18, 1989.  The games were played in Mexico City.  This FIBA AmeriCup was to earn the five berths allocated to the Americas for the 1990 FIBA World Championship in Argentina.  Puerto Rico defeated the United States in the final to win the tournament.  Brazil, Venezuela, and Canada also qualified for the World Championship by finishing third through fifth, respectively.

Qualification
Eight teams qualified during the qualification tournaments held in their respective zones in 1989; two teams (USA and Canada) qualified automatically since they are the only members of the North America zone.
North America: , 
Caribbean and Central America:, 

The draw split the tournament into two groups:
 
Group A

 
Group B

Format
The top four teams from each group advance to the knockout round. The losers from the knockout quarterfinals compete in a separate bracket to define fifth through eighth place.
Results and standings among teams within the same group are carried over.
The winners in the knockout semifinals advanced to the Final and were granted berths in the 1990 FIBA World Championship in Argentina. The losers figure in a third-place playoff and were both also granted berths in the FIBA World Championship. Since Argentina and the United States were already qualified as hosts and Olympic Champions respectively, should they reach one of the top four positions in the final standings, one or two extra berths should be granted to the fifth and/or sixth team in the final standings.

Squads

Preliminary round

Group A

|}

Group B

|}

Knockout round

Championship Bracket

Classification round

5th-8th places

Final standings

References
 1989 FIBA Americas Championship for Men, FIBA.com.

FIBA AmeriCup
1989 in Mexican sports
International basketball competitions hosted by Mexico
1988–89 in North American basketball
1988–89 in South American basketball